Joel Turrill (February 22, 1794 – December 28, 1859) was a judge, politician, and diplomat from New York. From 1833 to 1837, he served two terms in the  U.S. House of Representatives.

Life
Turrill was born February 22, 1794, in Shoreham, Vermont, and attended the common school. He later graduated from Middlebury College in 1816. He studied law in Newburgh, New York, and later moved to Oswego, New York, to practice after being admitted to the bar in 1819. He served as Justice of the Peace, County judge 1828-1833, and member of the State assembly in 1831.

Turrill was elected as a Jacksonian to the Twenty-third and Twenty-fourth Congresses in the House of Representatives from March 4, 1833, to March 3, 1837.
He was not a candidate for reelection in 1836.
He served as district attorney for Oswego County 1838-1840, and surrogate of Oswego County in 1843.
He was appointed United States consul to the Kingdom of Hawaii 1845-1850.

Personal life
Turrill married Mary Sullivan Hubbard on Dec. 21, 1830 in Champion, New York. They had four children: William, Elizabeth Douglas, Mary Hubbard and Frederick. The older daughter, Elizabeth Douglas (Turrill) Van Denburgh, wrote an account of the family's voyage in 1845 and 1846 to the "Sandwich Islands" when her father was appointed U.S. Consul-General to the Kingdom of Hawaii.

References

1794 births
1859 deaths
Middlebury College alumni
Jacksonian members of the United States House of Representatives from New York (state)
19th-century American politicians
Oswego County District Attorneys
Members of the United States House of Representatives from New York (state)